The Rangeley River is located in Franklin County, Maine, in the United States.  It is only about a mile long, connecting the outlet of Rangeley Lake with Mooselookmeguntic Lake.

It is part of the Androscoggin River watershed.

References

Tributaries of the Kennebec River
Rivers of Franklin County, Maine
Rivers of Maine